Natasha Jane Bargeus (born 8 June 1971) is a former Australian basketball player born in Port Hedland, Western Australia.

She played a total of 177 games from 1988 to 1998 for the Perth Breakers in the Women's National Basketball League.

She was part of the Australian team which won bronze at the 1989 FIBA Under-19 World Championship for Women in Bilbao, Spain.

On 13 September 2000, she was awarded the Australian Sports Medal for basketballing achievements.

References

1971 births
Living people
Australian women's basketball players
Perth Lynx players
Recipients of the Australian Sports Medal